Antonio Cifaldi (7 October 1899 – 27 June 1967) was an Italian politician who served as Mayor of Benevento (1944–1945), member of the Constituent Assembly (1946–1948), Deputy (1948–1953) and Undersecretary of State (1945–1946, 1947–1950).

References

1899 births
1967 deaths
Mayors of Benevento
Deputies of Legislature I of Italy
Members of the Constituent Assembly of Italy
People from Benevento
Italian Liberal Party politicians